In enzymology, a poly(ribitol-phosphate) N-acetylglucosaminyl-transferase is an enzyme that catalyzes the chemical reaction

UDP-N-acetyl-D-glucosamine + poly(ribitol phosphate)  UDP + (N-acetyl-D-glucosaminyl)poly(ribitol phosphate)

Thus, the two substrates of this enzyme are UDP-N-acetyl-D-glucosamine and poly(ribitol phosphate), whereas its two products are UDP and (N-acetyl-D-glucosaminyl)poly(ribitol phosphate).

This enzyme belongs to the family of glycosyltransferases, specifically the hexosyltransferases.  The systematic name of this enzyme class is UDP-N-acetyl-D-glucosamine:poly(ribitol-phosphate) N-acetyl-D-glucosaminyltransferase. Other names in common use include UDP acetylglucosamine-poly(ribitol phosphate), acetylglucosaminyltransferase, uridine diphosphoacetylglucosamine-poly(ribitol phosphate), and acetylglucosaminyltransferase.

References

 

EC 2.4.1
Enzymes of unknown structure